Tsing Yi Lutheran Village, also referewd to as Tsing Yi Lutheran New Village, is a village on Tsing Yi Island. It locates near Chung Mei Village.

Temples
There are several temples that was moved together with former resident in Tsing Yi Town. 
 Tsing Tak Tong Tat-more Temple; a Bodhidharma temple .
 Tai Yam Neong Neong Temple; a Taoist temple, worshipping the Goddess of Moon, Tai Yin Niang Niang.
 Tai Wong Temple, a Taoist temple.

Tsing Yi
Villages in Kwai Tsing District, Hong Kong